Iván Franco Sopegno (born 25 September 1963 in Rosario Central) is an Argentine football manager and former player.

Playing career 
Sopegno played for a number of clubs in Guatemala including CSD Municipal, Galcasa and Izabal JC.

He also played in Peru for Cienciano de Cuzco and  Municipal de Lima.

He started and ended his football in his homeland of Argentina for Rosario Central and Argentinos Juniors respectively.

Managerial career 
He has spent the majority of his career coaching clubs in Central America, where he has won multiple league titles, most notably in Guatemala with CSD Comunicaciones (5 titles). His five championships in Guatemala are the third most by any coach behind Rubén Amorín's eight and Horacio Cordero's six.

On 21 May 2014 he was named by the Federación Nacional de Fútbol de Guatemala as the new coach of the Guatemala national team.

External links
 
 

 

1963 births
Living people
Argentine footballers
Argentinos Juniors footballers
Argentine football managers
Guatemala national football team managers
2015 CONCACAF Gold Cup managers
Association football goalkeepers
C.S.D. Galcasa players
Footballers from Rosario, Santa Fe